A Face in the Crowd may refer to:

 A Face in the Crowd (film), a 1957 film starring Andy Griffith and Patricia Neal
 "A Face in the Crowd" (Michael Martin Murphey and Holly Dunn song), 1987
 "A Face in the Crowd" (Tom Petty song),1989
 A Face In the Crowd (album), a 2011 album by Edo G
 A Face in the Crowd (novella), a 2012 novella by Stephen King and Stewart O'Nan
 "(A) Face in the Crowd", a song by The Kinks from the 1975 album Soap Opera
 Face in the Crowd, a 1999 album by Leon Russell album
 "Face in the Crowd", a song by Little River Band from the 1986 album No Reins